Operation Ceasefire is the name for a guns-for-tickets exchange program that was run by the Denver Police Department, in conjunction with the Denver Nuggets, Colorado Rockies, and Denver Broncos in the late 1990s.

References

History of Denver